Gyeongju station is a railway station in the city of Gyeongju. It operates on the Jungang Line and the Donghae Line.

References

External links
 Cyber station information from Korail

Railway stations in North Gyeongsang Province
Gyeongju
Railway stations opened in 1918
Railway stations closed in 2021